Eusclera is a genus of harvestmen in the family Sclerosomatidae from China and India.

Species
 Eusclera aureomaculata Roewer, 1910
 Eusclera indica (Turk, 1948)

References

Harvestmen
Harvestman genera